Metagalaxy is a term referring to a large-scale galactic system. It may refer to

A galactic group or cluster
A group of clusters, such as a supercluster
The entire system of galaxies making up the large-scale structure of the universe
Multiple virtual worlds clustered together as perceived collectives under a single authority